The Southern Rustic (Rhyacia lucipeta) is a moth of the family Noctuidae. It is found in Morocco, Algeria, the Pyrenees, the mountains of central Europe, Italy, the Balkans, Turkey, the Caucasus, Transcaucasia and Iraq. It is a rare migrant on the south coast of England, where it was recorded for the first time at Pulborough in Sussex in 1968. It had not been recorded again until the end of 2008.

The wingspan is 56–64 mm. Adults are on wing from June to the beginning of October in one generation.

The larvae feed on various herbaceous plants, including Cerastium, Thymus pulegioides, Tussilago farfara and Campanula rotundifolia.

External links

 Hants moths
 Lepiforum.de
 schmetterlinge-deutschlands.de

Noctuinae
Moths of Europe
Moths of Asia